Varthur Vidhan Sabha seat was one of the seats in Karnataka Legislative Assembly in India. It was abolished in the 2008 delimitation exercise, which redrew boundaries of the constituencies.

Members of Vidhan Sabha 
 1962: Constituency did not exist.
 1967: K Prabhakar (Congress)   
 1972: K Prabhakar (Congress) 
 1978: Ramachandra reddy (Janata Party) 
 1983: S.Suryanarayan rao (CPM) - Election declared void by the Karnataka High Court on 22 December 1984
 1985: A Krishnappa (Congress)  
 1989: A Krishnappa (Congress)  
 1994: Ashwathnarayana reddy (Janata Dal)  
 1999: A Krishnappa (Congress) 
 2004: A Krishnappa (Congress)  
 2008 onwards: Constituency abolished in 2008 delimitation exercise.

See also 
 List of constituencies of Karnataka Legislative Assembly

References 

Bangalore Urban district
Former assembly constituencies of Karnataka